John Hamilton Blair (29 July 1889 – September 1972) was a Scottish mariner, who was first officer aboard the  during the Australasian Antarctic Expedition in 1913–1914. He later served in the Royal Navy during the First World War, where he was awarded the Distinguished Service Cross, as the head of Pangbourne Nautical College, and returned to the Navy during the Second World War.

During his early career, he worked aboard the Loch Line, which operated between Britain and Australia. He then joined a Melbourne shipping company, and worked the Australia–India trade. The Blair Islands, in Commonwealth Bay in Antarctica, were named after him by Douglas Mawson, the expedition leader.

He served as a lieutenant in the Royal Naval Reserve during the First World War, and was awarded the Distinguished Service Cross in 1917.

He later became chief executive officer of Pangbourne Nautical College. During the Second World War he returned to active service, commanding the boarding vessel Maron from 1940 to 1942, and then the auxiliary anti-aircraft ship  on the Tyne from 1942 to 1943.

References 

1880s births
1972 deaths
Australasian Antarctic Expedition
Recipients of the Distinguished Service Cross (United Kingdom)
Royal Navy officers of World War I
Royal Navy officers of World War II
Scottish sailors
Royal Naval Reserve personnel